Mbozi District is a district in Songwe Region, Tanzania.  It is bordered to the north by Chunya District, to the east by Mbeya Urban and Ileje Districts, to the south by Zambia and to the west by Rukwa Region.

According to the 2002 Tanzania National Census, the population of Mbozi District was 515,270.

The District Commissioner of Mbozi District is D.I. Rwegasira.

Administrative subdivisions

Mbozi District is administratively divided into six divisions, twenty-five wards (no longer including Tunduma, which now has its own town council) and 175 villages. The wards are:

 Chilulumo
 Chitete
 Chiwezi
 Halungu
 Igamba
 Ihanda
 Isandula
 Isansa
 Itaka
 Ivuna
 Iyula
 Kamsamba
 Kapele
 Mlangali
 Mlowo
 Msangano
 Msia
 Myovizi
 Myunga
 Nambinzo
 Ndalambo
 Nkangamo
 Nyimbili
 Ruanda (Mbozi)
 Vwawa

Notes

References
 

Districts of Songwe Region